Nemenushchy is a rural locality (a khutor) in Alexeyevsky District, Belgorod Oblast, Russia. The population was 147 as of 2010. There are 2 streets.

Geography 
Nemenushchy is located 21 km southeast of Alexeyevka (the district's administrative centre) by road. Bozhkovo is the nearest rural locality.

References 

Rural localities in Alexeyevsky District, Belgorod Oblast
Biryuchensky Uyezd